Lucknow Air Force Station (Hindi:लखनऊ एयरफोर्स स्टेशन) known as Bakshi Ka Talab Air Force Station is located at Bakshi Ka Talab on the outskirt of Lucknow, Uttar Pradesh, India. It belongs to the Central Air Command. Sole user of this airport is the Indian Air Force. No. 35 Squadron IAF (Rapiers) is based here as an EW and Air superiority unit. It was founded by the British in the run up to WWII as a small airstrip, but expanded after Indian independence. This airbase stood for quick landing and take off in emergency cases. It is a small fighter unit ready to take part in combat in emergency. This station also responsible for navigating air traffic. This station located about 1.5 km from Bakshi ka talab main road. Kendriya Vidyalaya BKT school is also located there.

References

External links
 Bakshi Ka Talab Air Force Station Information

Indian Air Force bases
Lucknow district